BHRT (Bosnian-Herzegovinian Radio Television) Bosanskohercegovačka radiotelevizija/ Босанскохерцеговачка радиотелевизија) formerly known as PBSBiH (Public Broadcasting Service of Bosnia and Herzegovina; Bosnian: Javni radiotelevizijski servis Bosne i Hercegovine / Јавни радиотелевизијски сервис Босне и Херцеговине), is an umbrella broadcasting organization and the only member of the European Broadcasting Union from Bosnia and Herzegovina.

History

It was known as RTVBiH (Radio Television of Bosnia and Herzegovina; Bosnian: Radiotelevizija Bosne i Hercegovine / Радиотелевизија Босне и Херцеговине) from 1992 until 1998, when it was restructured into the current service.

On 1 January 1993, RTVBiH was admitted as an active member of the European Broadcasting Union. The membership  was transferred to the new parental broadcasting organisation PBSBiH in 2000.

RTVBiH (and consequently BHRT) grew out of RTV Sarajevo in 1992, one of eight principal broadcasting centers of former Yugoslavia, others being RTV Ljubljana, RTV Zagreb, RTV Belgrade, RTV Novi Sad, RTV Titograd, RTV Pristina, and RTV Skopje.

In June 2016, BHRT announced it will be suspending broadcasting at the end of June, as a consequence of insufficient funding. The European Broadcasting Union (EBU) expressed strong concern as this would have been the first time a public service broadcaster in Europe would have to interrupt its broadcasting because of financial difficulties.

Services
BHRT must broadcast content in the country's three official languages: Bosnian, Croatian and Serbian. The group manages a radio station, a television channel, media and music production label, and an internet portal. The service is governed by BHRT statute.

BHRT currently consists of three organizational units:

 BHT 1 – National public television channel, also available in HD on cable and satellite
 BH Radio 1 – National public radio service, heir to the old Radio Sarajevo. It began its regular broadcasts on April 10, 1945. Its programming is general, with newsletters, and it broadcasts content in the country's three languages.
 MP BHRT – Music production of BHRT

See also 
List of radio stations in Bosnia and Herzegovina
Media of Bosnia and Herzegovina

References

External links 

 
 
 

 
European Broadcasting Union members
Multilingual broadcasters
Publicly funded broadcasters
Radio stations established in 1946
Television channels and stations established in 1961
Television networks in Bosnia and Herzegovina
1946 establishments in Yugoslavia
Government-owned companies of Bosnia and Herzegovina